Gilan-e Gharb (Kurdish: Gyellan گیەڵان) (also Romanized as Gīlān-e Gharb; also known as Gharb) is the capital city of Gilan-e Gharb County, Kermanshah Province, Iran.

Demographics 
The city is populated by Kurds from the Kalhor tribe.

Infrastructure

Roads
The main access road is the Gilan-e Gharb-Eslamabad-e Gharb route connecting it to Kermanshah. It is also located on the Qasr-e Shirin-Ilam road which has become a shorter route after the paving of the nawdar rural road in 2015. Other routes include the Gilan-e Gharb-Sarpol-e Zahab and Gilan-e Gharb-Sumar roads.

References

Populated places in Gilan-e Gharb County
Cities in Kermanshah Province
Kurdish settlements in Kermanshah Province